This is the list of awards and nominations given to Ira Losco. On 13 December 2008, a national holiday in Malta in remembrance of Malta becoming a Republic, Ira Losco was awarded a national medal for work done which helped the country in such a short time - Gieh ir-Repubblika.

Awards and nominations

2002

Eurovision Song Contest 2002
7th Wonder – 2nd place

2003

Malta Music Awards 2003
Best Image – Won
Best Female Artist – Won
Best CD Single - 7th Wonder – Nominee

2004

Tune In's Battle Of The Babes
Battle Of The Babes – Won
Bay Music Awards
Best Solo Artist – Won
Best Single – Nominee

2005

Bay Music Awards
Best Solo Artist – Nominee
Best Single - Everyday – Nominee
Best Song Of All Time - Love Me Or Hate Me – Nominee

2006

Bailey's Woman Of The Year Award – Won
Best Live Act Award - Sole Festival  – Won
Award for Foreign Achievement - Sole Festival 

Bay Music Awards
Best Solo Artist – Won
Best Single - Driving One Of Your Cars – Won
Viewers' Choice Awards - Best Performance – Won

2007

Malta Music Awards
 Best Album - Accident Prone – Won
 Best Female Artist – Won
 Best Image – Nominee
 Best Video - Accident Prone – Nominee Best Local Export – Won Best Performance – NomineeBay Music Awards Best Solo Artist – Won2008Malta Music Awards Best Image – Nominee'''
 Best Female Artist – Won
 Best CD Cover Fortune Teller – Nominee
 Best Album Fortune Teller – Won
 Best Songwriter – Nominee
 Best Song (Idle Motion) – Nominee

Bay Music Awards
 Best Solo Artist – Nominee
 Best Song (Idle Motion) – Won

2009

Bay Music Awards
 Best Dance Tune / Remix (What's The Matter With Your Cabrio? (DJ Ruby remix)) – Nominee

2019

Lovin Music Awards
 Best Solo Act — Winner
 Best Collaboration (Hey Now) (with Owen Leuellen) —  Winner

2020

Malta Music Awards
 Best Song (Hey Now) — Nominee
 Best Video (High) — Nominee
 Best Solo Artist'' — Winner

References

Losco, Ira